Cathy de Monchaux (born 1960) is a British sculptor.

Early life and education
Born in London, de Monchaux earned her BA at the Camberwell School of Art (1980–1983) and an MA at Goldsmiths College, University of London (1985–1987).

Style and career
Her sculptures use materials such as glass, paper, metal, fur and leather. Her works juxtapose seductive, soft elements, sometimes associated with strongly sexual overtones, with harder materials, often spikey or in some way appearing to constrain the softer parts, resulting in work which is both sensual and threatening. Her 1997 exhibition at the Whitechapel Gallery in particular made reference to organic forms (crustacea, fossils), animals, erotic and fetishistic imagery, turn of the century decorative traditions, architectural detailing and saintly relics.

She won a Steinberger Group Award in 1988 and the London Arts Individual Artist's Award in 1989.

De Monchaux's work from the early 1990s was often characterised by the combination of red velvet and steel in simple and strong constructions, but later works have tended to move towards lighter colours and a more ornamental approach.

De Monchaux was shortlisted for the Turner Prize in 1998. She currently lives in London and is a part-time teacher at the Slade School of Art. However, she has exhibited in the United States almost as much as, if not more than, she has in England.

In her recent work, such as The Raft (2016) and State Secrets (2014), de Monchaux has concentrated more on subjects such as battles, unicorns and imagery confusing fauna, mineral and flora.

In Sweetly the Air Flew Overhead, Battle with Unicorns (2007-8), the work shows small soft sculptures of riders on unicorns entangled in string, cloth and tree figures. It is reminiscent of Uccello's Battle of San Romano series where distinct horses, lances and knights celebrate human control and clarity, not least in the painter's obsessive use of perspective. By contrast, de Monchaux depicts a battle with spike-helmet knights riding unicorns that struggle in a chaos of things: to be in a battle is to be inside a mess.

De Monchaux herself has mentioned recognising an unconscious allusion here to the Iraq War.

References

External links
Works in the Tate Collection
"Deep in the Woods with Cathy de Monchaux"

1960 births
Living people
20th-century British sculptors
20th-century English women artists
21st-century British sculptors
21st-century English women artists
Alumni of Camberwell College of Arts
Alumni of Goldsmiths, University of London
English women sculptors
Sculptors from London